Mariano S. Ninonuevo (born 15 August 1921) is a Filipino former sports shooter. He competed in the 50 metre pistol event at the 1964 Summer Olympics.

References

External links
 

1921 births
Possibly living people
Filipino male sport shooters
Olympic shooters of the Philippines
Shooters at the 1964 Summer Olympics
Place of birth missing (living people)